San Francisco Eagle (also SF Eagle, or simply The Eagle; formerly Eagle Tavern) is a gay bar in San Francisco's South of Market neighborhood, in the U.S. state of California. The bar caters to the bear community and the leather subculture. Lex Montiel is one of the bar's owners, as of 2018.

The San Francisco South of Market Leather History Alley consists of four works of art along Ringold Alley honoring the leather subculture; it opened in 2017. One of the works of art is metal bootprints along the curb which honor 28 people (including Terry Thompson, who managed the bar) who were an important part of the leather communities of San Francisco.

See also

 The Eagle (bar)
 List of San Francisco Designated Landmarks

References

External links
 
 

Bear (gay culture)
Leather bars and clubs
LGBT drinking establishments in California
San Francisco Designated Landmarks
South of Market, San Francisco